GGM is an Indian film music composer who primarily works in Tamil films. Debut movie Maathi Yosi in the screen name of "Guru Kalyan" in 2010 was nominated for "Best Debutant Music Director" by Vijay Music Awards 2010.

Apart from films, GGM has composed music for short films and independent music albums.

Filmography

Music albums

Short films

References

External links
 ஒரு நா காத்து - ஆவணப்படம்
 ஒரு நாள் காத்து- கஜா புயலின் கோரத்தை சொல்லும் படம்
 டேக் திங்ஸ் ஈஸி, ஹியர் இஸ் கிரேசி” –  குழந்தைகள் தின சிறப்பு பாடல்
 கிரேசி மோகன் வரிகள், குரு கல்யாண் இசையில் குழந்தைகள் தின சிறப்பு பாடல்
 இசையமைப்பாளர் குருகல்யாணின் இசை ஆல்பம்! 'Naalai Unadhe'
 விகடன் அங்கீகரித்த குரு கல்யாண் மீம்ஸ் பாடல்
 MS Subbulakshmi's great grand daughter S.Aishwarya debut in Kural 146 Tamil movie
 ஸ்ட்ரெஸ் எல்லாம் பறந்துபோகும்: ஜீரோ தான் டா ஹீரோ பாடலைக் கேளுங்கள்
 Guru Kalyan Talks About Getting Late singer M. S. Subbulakshmi's Great-GrandDaughter Aishwarya To Sing A Song For ‘Kural 146’
 செம கருத்தை ஜாலியாக சொல்லும் 'ஜீரோ தாண்டா ஹீரோ' பாடல்
 Celebrating the special bond between Actor Vijay and his fans, a Vijay Anthem
 குழந்தைகள் தினத்தையொட்டி வைரலாகும் பாரதியார் பாட்டு.. இது நச் ரீமேக்
 குழந்தைகள் தினத்தை முன்னிட்டு இசையமைப்பாளர் குரு கல்யாண் பாரதியார் பாடல்
 விஜய் ரசிகர்களுக்காக குரு கல்யாண் போட்ட 'இளைய தளபதி ரசிகன்டா' 
 தமிழனின் நெஞ்சை நிமிர்த்தும் 'வீரத்தமிழன்" பாடல்
 வதுவை நன்மணம்!’ - பழநிபாரதியின் கவிதை... பாடலானது
 Guru Kalyan excited about his new album Kotti
 Musical sojourn – Article on GuruKalyan from Times Of India
 MaathiYosi music review – BehindWoods

Tamil film score composers
Living people
Year of birth missing (living people)